"Hi no Tori" *(火の鳥; "Fire Bird", or "Phoenix") is the 12th single by Mika Nakashima, and was used as the ending theme for the NHK anime Hi no Tori. It reached #9 on the Oricon weekly charts and sold roughly 40,000 copies.

Track listing
 "Hi no Tori" (火の鳥; "Fire Bird", "Phoenix"
 "Missing
 "Hi no Tori" (Instrumental)

References

2004 singles
Mika Nakashima songs
2004 songs